Wang Jianjiahe (born 17 July 2002) is a Chinese swimmer. She competed in the women's 1500 metre freestyle event at the 2018 Asian Games, winning the gold medal. She competed in the 2018 Fina Short Course World Championships in Hangzhou, China her home country and won her first World Championship gold in the Women's 800 meter freestyle gold, and won silver in the Women's 400 meter freestyle. She also added a gold in the women's 4 x 200 meter freestyle relay, swimming the anchor leg. At the 2018 FINA Swimming World Cup she won silver in the 400m freestyle and a gold in the 800 metre freestyle.

Personal bests

Long course (50-meter pool)

Short course (25-meter pool)

Key: NR = National Record ; AS = Asian Record

References

External links
 

2002 births
Living people
Chinese female freestyle swimmers
Place of birth missing (living people)
Asian Games medalists in swimming
Asian Games gold medalists for China
Swimmers at the 2018 Asian Games
Medalists at the 2018 Asian Games
Swimmers at the 2020 Summer Olympics
World record holders in swimming
World Aquatics Championships medalists in swimming
Sportspeople from Anshan
Swimmers from Liaoning
Olympic swimmers of China